Eliot Cutler (born July 29, 1946) is a former American lawyer who was an Independent candidate in Maine's 2010 and 2014 gubernatorial races. In 2010, he placed second in a multi-way race, receiving 208,270 votes, equaling 35.9%, narrowly losing to Republican Paul LePage. In 2014 he garnered only 8.4%, placing third behind both the Democratic candidate as well as LePage, who was re-elected with 48.2% of the vote. Both times, he was claimed to be a spoiler for the Democratic candidate.  In March 2022, Cutler was arrested and charged with four counts of possessing child pornography.

Cutler had previously served in the Carter Administration as part of the U.S. Office of Management and Budget.

Early life and career 
Cutler was born and raised in a Jewish family in Bangor, Maine, the eldest son of Lawrence and Catherine Cutler.  His father was a physician and his mother was an economist.

Cutler received secondary education at Deerfield Academy. He then proceeded to graduate from Harvard College and later earned a degree from Georgetown Law.

Cutler began his career as a legislative assistant to Senator Edmund Muskie of Maine, helping craft the Clean Water Act and the Clean Air Act.

He served as associate director for Natural Resources, Energy and Science in the Office of Management and Budget in the Carter administration, and was the principal White House official for energy.

He then worked from 1980 to 1988 for the law firm Webster & Sheffield, focusing mostly on environmental and land use issues.

He was a founding partner of Cutler & Stanfield LLP, with fellow Webster & Sheffield associate Jeffrey Stanfield, which became the second-largest environmental law firm in the country, eventually merging that practice with international firm Akin Gump in 2000.

In 1990, Cutler purchased property on Shore Road in Cape Elizabeth. In an interview with Portland Magazine, Cutler recounted the purchase, "It took two years to find this property. Once we saw it and bought it, we wanted to build a house that sat well on land and was not overly imposing, from the road or the water. We needed lots of room for us and our family, a growing family along the course of time, where we could gather family and friends to enjoy the Maine Coast with us." Cutler resided in Cape Elizabeth with his wife, Melanie Stewart Cutler, during his gubernatorial campaigns. They have two adult children. In 2006, Cutler moved to Beijing, where he acquired a collection of Chinese vernacular furniture and antiques. When he moved back to his home in Cape Elizabeth, he integrated the Far East influence with the Maine mystique of the residence. In May 2017, Cutler put his  oceanfront home in Cape Elizabeth for sale for $11 million, citing his intention to move to a condominium in nearby Portland  and also to look for a place on the water in Maine. At the end of 2020, the home was purchased by Jonathan S. Bush.

2010 gubernatorial campaign 

On December 9, 2009, Cutler officially launched his campaign for governor of Maine. Had he been elected, he would have been Maine's third independent governor.  He was endorsed by Maine's second Independent governor, Angus King.

In a close election-night race, Cutler took an early lead. As the results came in from Maine's smaller and more rural communities, Cutler's lead shrank, and eventually opponent Paul LePage took the lead. Based on early, unofficial results, the Bangor Daily News projected that LePage would win, and Cutler conceded on the morning after the election.

2014 gubernatorial campaign 

On June 6, 2013, Cutler announced on radio station WGAN's morning show that he would again run for governor, with a formal announcement coming after Labor Day. He dismissed the suggestion that his candidacy would result in another LePage victory, stating that he wouldn't run if he didn't think he could win. While he was again endorsed by Angus King on August 18, 2014  King withdrew his endorsement on October 29, 2014, in favor of the Democratic Party candidate, Mike Michaud.

Cutler finished a distant third, with LePage winning reelection. Though many Democrats believe that Cutler was a two-time spoiler, it is a label he and his supporters reject.

Other political involvement 
He served on the board of directors of Americans Elect, a nonprofit 501(c)(4) corporation which sought to gain ballot access for a presidential ticket, to be chosen through an online national primary, in every state in the 2012 Presidential Election.

Cutler endorsed Angus King in the 2012 U.S. Senate election to succeed the retiring Olympia Snowe. King won the election.

Since the 2014 election, the second in a row in which the governor was elected with less than a majority, Maine became the first state in the country to introduce ranked choice voting in its election, with the multi-way race between LePage, Cutler, and the Democratic candidate often being seen as an impetus for this action. Cutler had been a proponent of this system during the 2010 election, believing he would have won if it had been implemented then. However, due to the state constitution's rules on gubernatorial elections, ranked choice voting is not allowed to be used for the position.

Cutler announced on April 2, 2015, that he would not run for governor again, stating that he was taking a "vow of abstinence" from doing so. He also announced his appointment by the University of Maine System to lead the creation of a new graduate center unifying existing graduate programs at the University of Southern Maine, University of Maine, and the University of Maine School of Law.

In May 2017, Cutler announced that he would work with the political organization Maine Independents to recruit candidates for the 2018 elections. The organization was founded by supporters of Cutler's gubernatorial campaigns. He also announced his support for State Treasurer Terry Hayes for governor in the following year's gubernatorial election.

2022 arrest 
In March 2022, Cutler was arrested and charged with four counts of possessing child pornography.

References

External links
 2014 campaign site 
 Cutler, Eliot, "Who Stole Election Day?" , Wall Street Journal, November 17, 2010. "[U]nrestricted absentee voting and early in-person voting, 'convenience voting' ... [appear] to be discouraging voter engagement".

1946 births
American lawyers
Americans Elect people
Georgetown University Law Center alumni
Harvard College alumni
Jewish American people in Maine politics
Living people
Maine Independents
People from Cape Elizabeth, Maine
Politicians from Bangor, Maine
University of Maine people
Deerfield Academy alumni
21st-century American Jews